Sárnait, also known as Surney of Drumacoo or Sourney, was a 6th-century Irish saint.

Surney was an associate of Colman mac Duagh, who was the bishop of the locality at the time. Her background is unknown, but may have been a name of Uí Fiachrach Aidhne like Colman. Her floruit is estimated from Colmán mac Cobthaig to Guaire Aidne mac Colmáin. Surney was the founder of the church of Drumacoo, in the parish of Ballinderreen, County Galway around 550. A later medieval church, now disused, now stands on the site of the original foundation. The adjoining graveyard is still in use.

References

Sources
 The Manners and Customs of Hy Fiachrach, John O'Donovan, (Dublin, 1846)
 Episcopal Succession, John Brady, Rome, 1876
 The History and Antiquities of the Diocese of Kilmacduagh, Jerome A. Fahy, 1893
 Irish Catholic Directory for 1909

External links
 http://www.stcolman.com/life_monastery.html

People from County Galway
6th-century Irish people
6th-century Irish women
Female saints of medieval Ireland